Enoclerus eximius is a species of checkered beetle in the family Cleridae. It is found in North America.

References

Further reading

External links

 

Clerinae
Articles created by Qbugbot
Beetles described in 1843